Robert Benjamin Black  (December 10, 1862 – March 21, 1933) was a 19th-century professional baseball player. He played for the Kansas City Cowboys of the Union Association in 1884.

External links

1862 births
1933 deaths
Major League Baseball outfielders
Major League Baseball pitchers
Kansas City Cowboys (UA) players
Quincy Quincys players
Memphis Browns players
Omaha Omahogs players
Keokuk Hawkeyes players
Memphis Grays players
Wilkes-Barre Barons (baseball) players
Lynn Shoemakers players
Sioux City Corn Huskers players
19th-century baseball players
Baseball players from Ohio
Memphis Reds players